Pokémon Journeys: The Series is the twenty-third season of the Pokémon anime series and the first and titular season of Pokémon Journeys: The Series, known in Japan as . The season premiered from November 17, 2019, to December 4, 2020, on TV Tokyo channel 7, and in the United States, it releases as a streaming television season that premiered from June 12, 2020, to March 5, 2021, on Netflix, making it the first Pokémon series not to air on conventional broadcast television in the United States, unlike previous series. It premiered in Canada on Teletoon on a weekly basis from May 9, 2020, to June 5, 2021. This season follows the adventures of Ash Ketchum and Goh as they travel across all eight regions of the Pokémon franchise, including the new Galar region from Pokémon Sword and Shield. Supporting characters include Professor Cerise, a Pokémon researcher who oversees Ash and Goh's missions, and his daughter Chloe, Goh's childhood friend. On April 23, 2020, The Pokémon Company International announced that Netflix has secured the U.S. rights to release future seasons, starting with "Pokémon Journeys". Episodes were released in quarterly groups of twelve. On September 13, 2020, it was announced the anime will switch from airing on Sundays to Fridays on October 9, 2020. The show began airing on September 1, 2020 on Pop in the United Kingdom. The show aired on Pop Max on August 30, 2021. This is available in India in Hindi dub from October 29, 2021.

Its instrumental version serves as the ending theme.



Episode list

Reception

Critical response 
The series received a B+ score at Anime News Network.

Notes

References 

2019 Japanese television seasons
2020 Japanese television seasons
Anime postponed due to the COVID-19 pandemic
Season23